The Cinchoneae are a tribe of flowering plants in the family Rubiaceae  containing about 125 species in 9 genera. Representatives are found from Costa Rica to southern tropical America. Species within Cinchoneae are characterized as small trees or shrubs with imbricate or valvate corolla aestivation and often dry capsular fruits. Many species contain alkaloids.

Genera 
Currently accepted names

 Ciliosemina Antonelli (2 sp)
 Cinchona L. (24 sp)
 Cinchonopsis L.Andersson (1 sp)
 Joosia H.Karst. (12 sp)
 Ladenbergia Klotzsch (35 sp)
 Maguireocharis Steyerm. (1 sp)
 Pimentelia Wedd. (1 sp)
 Remijia DC. (45 sp)
 Stilpnophyllum Hook.f. (4 sp)

Synonyms

 Cascarilla (Endl.) Wedd. = Ladenbergia 
Cephalodendron Steyerm. = Remijia
 Kinkina Adans. = Cinchona
 Macrocneumum Vand. = Remijia
 Quinquina Boehm. = Cinchona

References 

 
Cinchonoideae tribes